Tim Smith (born July 21, 1981) is a Canadian former professional ice hockey forward who last played with High1 of the Asia League Ice Hockey.

Playing career
Smith played major junior in the WHL for four seasons with the Spokane Chiefs and Swift Current Broncos.  Despite a team-leading 96 points, fifth in league scoring, in his draft year, he was a late selection in the 2000 NHL Entry Draft, being selected 272nd overall by the Vancouver Canucks.

Smith turned pro in 2002–03, joining the Columbia Inferno of the ECHL.  After a 59-point rookie campaign with the Inferno, he reeled off 95 points in 2003–04 to win the league scoring championship.  His success in the ECHL was met with playing time in the AHL, as he split the following season between the Inferno and Manitoba Moose.

In 2005–06, Smith moved overseas to play in the German 2nd Bundesliga with EHC Freiburg.  He scored at a point-per-game pace in his first season in Germany with 51 points in 51 games. In 2006-07 Smith moved to the Asian Hockey League. He played for Kangwon Land Ice Hockey Team. He played 33 games and finished the season with 60 points. In 2007-08 he returned to the Asian Hockey League to play for High 1. He played 30 games and finished the year with 46 points. Smith returned to Europe for the 2008-09 season and started in the Swiss B for Lausanne. He played 9 games and finished with 4 points. After his brief stint in the Swiss B he returned Germany to play in the 2nd Bundesliga with Tölzer Löwen. He finished that year with 35 games, 29 points.

On May 18, 2010, Smith signed an extension to return to High 1.

Awards
Western Hockey League
1999–2000 West First All-Star Team
ECHL

Asia League

Career statistics

References

External links

1981 births
Canadian ice hockey centres
Columbia Inferno players
EC Bad Tölz players

EHC Freiburg players

High1 players
Ice hockey people from Alberta
Lausanne HC players
Living people
Manitoba Moose players
People from Lac Ste. Anne County
Spokane Chiefs players
Swift Current Broncos players
Vancouver Canucks draft picks